Minerton is a former town in Vinton County, in the U.S. state of Ohio. The GNIS classifies it as a populated place.

History
The first store in Minerton opened in 1880. A post office was established at Minerton in 1880, and remained in operation until 1914.

References

Unincorporated communities in Vinton County, Ohio
Unincorporated communities in Ohio